Mariampol may refer to:
Polish name for Marijampolė in Lithuania
Mariampol, Biała Podlaska County in Lublin Voivodeship (east Poland)
Mariampol, Opoczno County in Łódź Voivodeship (central Poland)
Mariampol, Zgierz County in Łódź Voivodeship (central Poland)
Mariampol, Opole Lubelskie County in Lublin Voivodeship (east Poland)
Mariampol, Świętokrzyskie Voivodeship (south-central Poland)
Mariampol, Grodzisk Mazowiecki County in Masovian Voivodeship (east-central Poland)
Mariampol, Kozienice County in Masovian Voivodeship (east-central Poland)
Mariampol, Greater Poland Voivodeship (west-central Poland)

See also
Mariyampil
Mariampole
Marienfeld
Marienfelde